Lir Tahrak (also Romanized as Līr Taḩrak; also known as Līr Tarak and Līr Tork) is a village in Dehdasht-e Sharqi Rural District, in the Central District of Kohgiluyeh County, Kohgiluyeh and Boyer-Ahmad Province, Iran. At the 2006 census, its population was 639, in 119 families.

References 

Populated places in Kohgiluyeh County